New York's 117th State Assembly district is one of the 150 districts in the New York State Assembly. It has been represented by Ken Blankenbush since 2011.

Geography

2020s
District 117 contains a majority of St. Lawrence County, all of Lewis County, and portions of Oneida and Jefferson counties.

2010s
District 117 contains a majority of Jefferson County, all of Lewis County, and portions of Oneida and St. Lawrence counties.

Recent election results

2022

2020

2018

2016

2014

2012

References

117
Jefferson County, New York
Lewis County, New York
St. Lawrence County, New York
Oneida County, New York